SMART Magazine was a Hawaii-based fashion, beauty and lifestyle publication, featuring "information and advice on all aspects of fashion, beauty, and lifestyle.". The publication was sold throughout Hawaii and was also available through online subscription. For a time, it edited a regular column in MidWeek.

The magazine was launched in April 2005 in a flurry of local publicity.  It was at first published eight times a year, and was published quarterly by the time of its closing.

SMART Magazine's fall 2008 issue was its final one.

Staff
 Molly Watanabe (Founder/Publication Director): Advertising, Marketing, PR
 Amy Alston (Founder/Publication Director): Advertising, Distribution
 Sarah Honda (Editor/Art Director): Editorial

References

External links
Archived website

2005 establishments in Hawaii
Bimonthly magazines published in the United States
Lifestyle magazines published in the United States
Fashion magazines published in the United States
Local interest magazines published in the United States
Magazines established in 2005
Magazines published in Hawaii
Magazines disestablished in 2008
2008 disestablishments in Hawaii